Ragtown was a mining town, now a ghost town, in the Mojave Desert, San Bernardino County, California, United States. John Sutter found gold in the Bagdad-Chase area in about 1898.

A plaque in memory of this place is installed by E Clampus Vitus on May 3, 1981, about six miles south of Ludlow, California.

The plaque reads:
Site of Ragtown and the Buckeye Mining District
At this location, Ragtown stood as a part of the once-booming "Buckeye Mining District". One mine in the district, the Bagdad-Chase, discovered by John Suter in the 1880s, was to become the largest single source of copper and gold in San Bernardino County. The owner, Benjamin Chase, built the Ludlow and Southern Railroad, just west of here, to carry ore to the Santa Fe Railroad in Ludlow.

References

Populated places in the Mojave Desert
Ghost towns in California
Mining communities in California
Former settlements in San Bernardino County, California